This is a  list of films produced in Costa Rica. 

About Us (2016)
La apuesta (1968)
Asesinato en el Meneo (2001)
The Awakening of the Ants (2019)
Bonne année (2006) 
Brinca brinca la cuerdita (1995)
La Calera (1998) 
El Camino (2007) 
Caribe (2004) 
C'est comme ça (2005) 
El Cielo Rojo (2008)
Clara Sola (2021)
Costa Rica, S.A. (2006) (TV)
Doble llave y cadena (2005) 
En el nombre del pueblo (2000) 
Et Hjørne af paradis (1997) 
Eulalia (1987) 
First Lady of the Revolution (2016)
Gestación (2009)
La Insurrección (1980)
It's a Jungle Out There... An Independent Film in Costa Rica (2004) (TV) 
El Loco, Cacharro y su capitán (2002) 
Maikol Yordan de Viaje Perdido (2014)
Marasmo (2003)
Medea (2017)
Milagro de amor (1955)
Mon amour (2006) 
Morirás con el sol (Motociclistas suicidas) (1973) 
Mujeres apasionadas (2003) 
La Negrita, el Milagro de Nuestra Señora de los Ángeles (1985)
NICA/raguense (2005) 
Nicaragua: Free Homeland or Death? (1978)
Nuestro pan de cada día (2001) 
Odyssey 2050 (2012)
Paso a paso: A sentimental journey (2006) 
Password: Una mirada en la oscuridad (2002)  
El Pecas (2004) 
La Pension (1999) 
Presos (2015)
Red Princesses (2013)
El Retorno (1930) 
Saber quién echó fuego ahí (2005) 
El Sanatorio (2010)
La Segua (1984)
Síncope (2003) 
The Sound of Things (2016)
Tropix (2002) 
Viaje (2015)
We Are Angels (1996)

See also 

 List of Costa Rican submissions for the Academy Award for Best Foreign Language Film

External links
 Costa Rican film at the Internet Movie Database

Lists of films by country of production

Films